Petra Zahrl (born April 4, 1981) is an Austrian former swimmer, who specialized in freestyle and butterfly events. Since 2009, she currently holds four Austrian records in the freestyle and medley relays. She also claimed a bronze medal in the 200 m butterfly (2:09.29) at the 2000 European Short Course Swimming Championships in Valencia, Spain.

Zahrl made her first Austrian team at the 2000 Summer Olympics in Sydney, where she competed in the women's 200 m butterfly. Swimming in heat two, she picked up a third spot and twenty-third overall by seven tenths of a second (0.70) behind Macedonia's Mirjana Boševska in 2:13.29.

At the 2004 Summer Olympics in Athens, Zahrl qualified again for the 200 m butterfly by eclipsing a FINA A-cut of 2:10.50 from the European Championships in Madrid. She challenged seven other swimmers on the same heat as Sydney, including top medal favorite Éva Risztov of Hungary. She edged out 15-year-old Kwon You-Ri of South Korea to take a seventh spot by 0.38 of a second in 2:13.92. Zahrl failed to advance into the semifinals, as she managed to repeat a twenty-third-place finish from Sydney in the preliminaries.

References

1981 births
Living people
Austrian female freestyle swimmers
Olympic swimmers of Austria
Swimmers at the 2000 Summer Olympics
Swimmers at the 2004 Summer Olympics
Austrian female butterfly swimmers
Swimmers from Vienna